Eike Heinrich Immel (born 27 November 1960) is a German former professional footballer who played as a goalkeeper from 1975 until 1997 for Borussia Dortmund, Vfb Stuttgart and Manchester City. He was capped at International level for West Germany and was part of his nations squads for the 1982 FIFA World Cup, 1986 FIFA World Cup, UEFA Euro 1980 and UEFA Euro 1988. Since retiring from football he spent three years as manager of VfR Heilbronn before working as a goalkeeping coach for Beşiktaş, Austria Wien and Fenerbahçe. Immel holds the record for 'most goals conceded by a Bundesliga goalkeeper' with 829 goals conceded in 534 games.

Club career
A leading youth international goalkeeper for West Germany in 1978, Eike Immel was still seventeen years of age when he succeeded Horst Bertram as Borussia Dortmund's first-choice. He remained Dortmund's top choice until his two million Deutsche Mark transfer to VfB Stuttgart in 1986, the biggest fee ever paid for a goalkeeper in the history of German football at that time. He served nine years as Stuttgart's regular goalkeeper, winning the Bundesliga title in 1992 and the UEFA Cup runner-up medal in 1989 with them. Afterwards he left for Manchester City, where he retired at the end of the 1996–97 season. He played 534 matches in the German top flight.

International career
His West Germany career lasted for just eight years due to his decision to retire from the West German team following EURO'88. Immel had been the starting goalkeeper since Harald Schumacher's ban from the team in 1987, and his 19th appearance in the semi-final of the 1988 UEFA European Football Championship at Volksparkstadion, Hamburg, remained his final cap for his country and made him miss out on the title winning 1990 FIFA World Cup squad for which Bodo Illgner then served as starting goalkeeper. The mentioned 1988 UEFA European Football Championship was Immel's fifth participation in a big international tournament. He later admitted his decision to retire from the international game at barely 28 just because of the competition from Bodo Illgner for the goalkeeper's jersey, was extremely hasty. He was included in the squad that won the 1980 UEFA European Championship.

Coaching career
Immel joined VfR Heilbronn in 1998 and managed the side until 2001. He has since worked as a goalkeeping coach most notably under Christoph Daum at Fenerbahçe in 2005, having also worked at Beşiktaş and FK Austria Wien.

Personal life
In January 2008, he was a contestant at Ich bin ein Star – Holt mich hier raus!, the German edition of I'm a Celebrity...Get Me Out of Here!.

Honours 
VfB Stuttgart
 Bundesliga: 1991–92
 DFL-Supercup: 1992
 UEFA Cup runner-up: 1988–89

West Germany
 UEFA European Football Championship: 1980
 FIFA World Cup runner-up: 1982, 1986

External links

References 

1960 births
Living people
People from Marburg-Biedenkopf
Sportspeople from Giessen (region)
1982 FIFA World Cup players
1986 FIFA World Cup players
UEFA Euro 1980 players
UEFA Euro 1988 players
Borussia Dortmund players
Fenerbahçe football managers
Bundesliga players
Association football goalkeepers
Expatriate footballers in England
German footballers
German expatriate footballers
Germany international footballers
Germany under-21 international footballers
Germany B international footballers
Manchester City F.C. players
Premier League players
VfB Stuttgart players
UEFA European Championship-winning players
Footballers from Hesse
German football managers
Ich bin ein Star – Holt mich hier raus! participants
West German footballers